André Albino Carvalho da Cunha (born 16 February 1978) is a Portuguese retired footballer who played as a midfielder, currently a manager.

Club career
Born in Cambeses, Barcelos, Cunha represented three clubs as a youth, including S.C. Braga from 1989 to 1992. During two of his formative years he took a break from association football and played futsal, already as a senior.

Cunha competed in amateur football until the age of 23. In the 2001–02 season he joined F.C. Famalicão of the third division and, from then onwards, rarely settled with a team, alternating between the third and the second tiers.

In mid-January 2010, Cunha signed for Gil Vicente F.C. in division two, from F.C. Vizela in the league immediately below. In his first full season, he contributed 25 games (23 starts, 2,035 minutes, two goals) as they returned to the Primeira Liga after a five-year absence.

Cunha made his debut in the Portuguese top flight on 12 August 2011 – at the age of 33 years, five months and 27 days – playing the full 90 minutes in a 2–2 home draw against S.L. Benfica. On 29 January of the following year he scored his second goal of the campaign, in a 3–1 home win over FC Porto.

References

External links

1978 births
Living people
People from Barcelos, Portugal
Portuguese footballers
Association football midfielders
Primeira Liga players
Liga Portugal 2 players
Segunda Divisão players
C.F. Fão players
F.C. Famalicão players
S.C. Covilhã players
F.C. Marco players
S.C. Espinho players
G.D. Ribeirão players
G.D. Estoril Praia players
F.C. Vizela players
Gil Vicente F.C. players
Vilaverdense F.C. players
Portuguese football managers
Merelinense F.C. managers
Sportspeople from Braga District